The 8th Africa Movie Academy Awards ceremony was held on 22 April 2012 at the Expo Centre, Eko Hotel & Suites in Lagos, Nigeria to honor the best African films of 2011. The nominees were announced on 17 March 2012 at the Kairaba Beach Hotel in Banjul, Gambia at an event that was attended by celebrities and top government officials from Gambia and other African countries.

Awards
{| class="wikitable"
|-
! style="background:#EEDD82; width:50%" | Best Film
! style="background:#EEDD82; width:50%" | Best Short Film
|-
| valign="top" |
 How to Steal 2 Million - South Africa
 State of Violence - South Africa
 Adesuwa - Nigeria
 Otelo Burning – South Africa
 Rugged Priest - Kenya
 Ties That Bind - Ghana
 Man on Ground - South Africa/Nigeria
| valign="top" |
  ''Braids on a Bald Head – Nigeria Jamaa – Uganda
 Look Again – Kenya
 Maffe Tiga – Guinea
 Hidden Life – South Africa
 Mwansa The Great - Zimbabwe
 Chumo – Tanzania
 The Young Smoker - Nigeria
|-
! style="background:#EEDD82; width:50%" | Best Documentary
! style="background:#EEDD82; width:50%" | Best Diaspora Feature
|-
| valign="top" |
 An African Election – Nigeria/Germany Beyond The Deadly Pit – Rwanda
 Awa Ogbe: An African Adventure – Algeria
 Dear Mandela – South Africa
 White & Black; Crime And Colour – Tanzania
 The Niger Delta Struggle – Ghana
 There Is Nothing Wrong With My Uncle –Nigeria
 How Much Is Too Much – Kenya
| valign="top" |
 Toussaint Louverture – Senegal/France Ghett'a Life - Jamaica
 High Chicago - Canada
 Elza - Guadalupe
 Better Mus' Come - Jamaica
 Kinyanrwanda - USA
|-
! style="background:#EEDD82; width:50%" | Best Diaspora Documentary
! style="background:#EEDD82; width:50%" | Best Diaspora (Short film)
|-
| valign="top" |
 The Education Of Auma Obama - Germany White Wash - USA
 Almendron Mi Corazon - Guadalupe
 All Me: The Life And Times Of Winfred Hubert - USA
| valign="top" |
  White Sugar In A Black Pot - USA John Doe - USA 
 The Lost One - USA
|-
! style="background:#EEDD82; width:50%" | Best Animation
! style="background:#EEDD82; width:50%" | Best film by an African Living Abroad
|-
| valign="top" |
 The Legend on Ngong Hills – Kenya 
 Oba - Nigeria
 Climate Change is Real – Kenya
 Egu – South Africa
 Nauliza - Kenya
| valign="top" |
  Housemates – UK/Nigeria  Mystery Of Birds – USA/Nigeria
  Ben Kross – Italy/Nigeria
  Paparazzi Eye In The Dark – USA/Nigeria/Ghana
|-
! style="background:#EEDD82; width:50%" | Achievement in Production Design
! style="background:#EEDD82; width:50%" | Achievement in Costume Design
|-
| valign="top" |
  Phone Swap – Nigeria Somewhere in Africa - Ghana
 Otelo Burning – South Africa
 Adesuwa - Nigeria
 How 2 Steal 2 Million - South Africa
| valign="top" |
  Adesuwa – Nigeria 
 The Captain Of Nakara - Kenya
 Rugged Priest -Kenya
 Somewhere In Africa - Ghana
 Queen's Desire - Nigeria
|-
! style="background:#EEDD82; width:50%" | Achievement in Make-up
! style="background:#EEDD82; width:50%" | Achievement in Soundtrack
|-
| valign="top" |
  Shattered – Kenya Rugged Priest - Kenya
 State Research Bureau - Uganda
 Adesuwa - Nigeria
 Somewhere In Africa - Ghana
| valign="top" |
 Alero's Symphony – Nigeria Otelo Burning – South Africa
 Adesuwa - Nigeria
 How 2 Steal 2 Million - South Africa
 Somewhere In Africa – Ghana
|-
! style="background:#EEDD82; width:50%" | Achievement in Visual effects
! style="background:#EEDD82; width:50%" | Achievement in Sound
|-
| valign="top" |
  Adesuwa – Nigeria 
 Behind The Mask - Nigeria
 Somewhere in Africa - Ghana
 State Research Bureau - Uganda
 Otelo Burning – South Africa
| valign="top" |
 State Of Violence – South Africa Otelo Burning – South Africa
 How To Steal 2 Million - South Africa
 Man on Ground - South Africa/Nigeria
 Algiers Murder - South Africa
|-
! style="background:#EEDD82; width:50%" | Achievement in Cinematography
! style="background:#EEDD82; width:50%" | Achievement in Editing
|-
| valign="top" |
  Otelo Burning – South Africa 
 How 2 Steal 2 Million - South Africa
 Rugged Priest - Kenya
 Masquerades - Ghana
 Man on Ground – South Africa/Nigeria
| valign="top" |
  How 2 Steal 2 Million- South Africa 
 Algiers Murder - South Africa
 Man on Ground - South Africa/Nigeria
 Unwanted Guest – Nigeria
 Otelo Burning – South Africa
 Alero's Symphony - Nigeria
|-
! style="background:#EEDD82; width:50%" | Achievement in Screenplay
! style="background:#EEDD82; width:50%" | Best Nigerian film
|-
| valign="top" |
  Ties That Bind – Ghana Mr & Mrs - Nigeria
 How 2 Steal 2 Million - South Africa
 Otelo Burning –South Africa
 Unwanted Guest -Nigeria
 Two Brides and a Baby - Nigeria
| valign="top" |
  Adesuwa – Nigeria 
 Unwanted Guest -Nigeria
 Family On Fire - Nigeria
 Alero's Symphony - Nigeria
 Phone Swap – Nigeria
|-
! style="background:#EEDD82; width:50%" | Best film in an African language
! style="background:#EEDD82; width:50%" | Best Child Actor
|-
| valign="top" |
 State Of Violence - South Africa Chumo - Tanzania
 Family On Fire - Nigeria
 Otelo Burning - South Africa
 Asoni - Cameroon
| valign="top" |
 Tshepang Mohlomi (Otelo Burning) – South Africa 
 Rahim Banda (Behind The Mask) - Nigeria
 Reginna Daniels (Bank Job) - Nigeria
 Benjamin Abemigisha (Jamaa) - Uganda
 Rachel Nduhukire (Jamaa) - Uganda
 Ayinla O. Abdulaheem (ZR-7) - Nigeria
|-
! style="background:#EEDD82; width:50%" | Best Young/Promising Actor
! style="background:#EEDD82; width:50%" | Best Actor in a Supporting Role
|-
| valign="top" |
 Ivie Okujaye (Alero's Symphony) – Nigeria Neo Ntatleno (State Of Violence) – South Africa
 Iyobosa Olaye (Adesuwa) – Nigeria
 Martha Ankomah (Somewhere in Africa) - Ghana
 Thomas Gumede (Otelo Burning) – South Africa
 Sihle Xaba (Otelo Burning) – South Africa
| valign="top" |
  Fana Mokoena (Man on Ground) – South Africa/Nigeria Rapulana Seiphemo (How 2 Steal 2 Million) – South Africa
 Hafiz Oyetoro (Phone Swap) - Nigeria
 Okey Uzoeshi (Two Brides and a Baby) - Nigeria
 Godfrey Theobejane (48) - Nigeria
 Lwanda Jawar (Rugged Priest) – Kenya
|-
! style="background:#EEDD82; width:50%" | Best Actress in a Supporting Role
! style="background:#EEDD82; width:50%" | Best Actor in a leading Role
|-
| valign="top" |
 Terry Pheto (How 2 Steal 2 Million) – South Africa 
 Ebbe Bassey (Ties That Bind) - Ghana
 Empress Njamah (Bank Job) - Nigeria
 Ngozi Ezeonu (Adesuwa) - Nigeria
 Thelma Okoduwa (Mr & Mrs) - Nigeria
 Omotola Jalade Ekeinde (Ties That Bind) - Ghana
| valign="top" |
 Majid Michel (Somewhere in Africa) – Ghana 
 Menzi Ngubane (How 2 Steal 2 Million) – South Africa
 Chet Anekwe (Unwanted Guest) - Nigeria
 Jafta Mamabolo (Otelo Burning) – South Africa
 Karabo Lance (48) - South Africa
 Wale Ojo (Phone Swap) - Nigeria
 Hakeem Kae-Kazim (Man on Ground) – Nigeria/South Africa
|-
! style="background:#EEDD82; width:50%" | Best Actress in a leading Role
! style="background:#EEDD82; width:50%" | Best Director
|-
| valign="top" |
  Rita Dominic (Shattered) – Nigeria Nse Ikpe Etim (Mr & Mrs) - Nigeria
 Yvonne Okoro (Single Six) - Ghana
 Ama K. Abebrese (Ties That Bind) - Ghana
 Uche Jombo (Damage) - Nigeria
 Millicent Makheido (48) – Nigeria
 Kudzai Sevenzo-Nyarai (Playing Warriors) - Zimbabwe
| valign="top" |
  Charlie Vundla (How 2 Steal 2 Million) – South Africa 
 Lancelot Oduwa Imasuen (Adesuwa) - Nigeria
 Leila Djansi (Ties That Bind) - Ghana
 Bob Nyanja (Rugged Priest) - Kenya
 Khalo Matabane (State Of Violence) – South Africa
 Akin Omotoso (Man on Ground) – South Africa/Nigeria
 Sara Bletcher (Otelo Burning) – South Africa
|}

Special Jury Prize
 Man on Ground'' - South Africa/Nigeria

References

Africa Movie Academy Awards
Africa Movie Academy Awards
Africa Movie Academy Awards ceremonies
Award
Africa Movie Academy Awards